Barrio Balboa is a corregimiento within the city of La Chorrera, in La Chorrera District, Panamá Oeste Province, Panama with a population of 29,589 as of 2010. Its population as of 1990 was 23,698; its population as of 2000 was 29,053.

References

Corregimientos of Panamá Oeste Province

es:Barrio Balboa (Panamá Oeste)